Keira may refer to:

 Keira (given name)
 The electoral district of Keira, in New South Wales, Australia
 Mount Keira, Wollongong, New South Wales, Australia
 The Keira dynasty, rulers of Darfur (Sudan, 17th-20th centuries)
 Keira (wrestler) (born 1995), ring name of Mexican masked professional wrestler